__notoc__

Keith Eric George Simmons is an American philosopher and Professor of Philosophy at University of Connecticut. He is known for his works on logic and philosophy of mind.

Books
Semantic Singularities: Paradoxes of Reference, Predication, and Truth, Oxford University Press 2018
 Truth (Oxford Readings in Philosophy), edited with Simon Blackburn, Oxford University Press 1999
 Universality and the Liar: An Essay on Truth and the Diagonal Argument, Cambridge University Press 1993

See also
Cantor's diagonal argument

References

External links
 Personal website

21st-century American philosophers
Philosophy academics
University of California, Los Angeles alumni
Living people
American logicians
Philosophers of mind
Philosophers of language
Alumni of University College London
University of North Carolina at Chapel Hill faculty
Alumni of Keele University
Year of birth missing (living people)
University of Connecticut faculty